Planet Records is an Italian independent label founded in 1998 by producer Roberto Ferrante. It has had twelve records certified platinum in Europe, four gold and two silver. Its records have sold several million copies.

Group 
Planet Records is part of an international Discographic & Publishing Group, with branches and / or operators in Miami, New York, Napoli, Milan, Paris, Havana-Cuba, Santo Domingo using a large worldwide distribution network of both "physical records" and "digital music". The Group is managed by the European headquarters staff. In the U.S., the staff includes human resources of great experience like Daisy De La Cruz as Head of Promotion, Marlene Maseda as TV promoter and Jeff Young (and his Venetian Staff) as sales manager. The brands Planet Records America and Planet Records Europe are an exclusive ownership, to the group also belong various international Music Publishing Companies and the recordin/remastering studio "Planet Recordings Studio" (intended only to Planet's own production). Since 2004, Planet is also operative in the sector of magazines with Latino!, bimonthly music magazine that, in 8 years, has sold in Italian newsstands more than 1,250,000 copies, and other successful magazine publications.

History 
Roberto Ferrante, a producer and remixer who had worked at Flying Records before its closure, created Planet Records.

In  2003 the company released Noelia's "Enamorada", followed by Aventura's  "Obsesión"

Planet Records created a music magazine with a CD included which has called it Latino! which almost 1,250,000 copies  sold in 8 years). At the end of 2004 Planet Records promoted a new Dominican artist, Papi Sánchez releasing the CD "Yeah Baby" and the single "Enamórame", which sold about 1,000,000 copies in Europe. In 2005/2006 Planet continues the collection of chart hits with the reconfirmation of Aventura among the 20 top sellers of the year with the album Love & Hate and God's Project, followed by the singles "Nore" ,  "Oye Mi Canto", Bascom X's "Lonely Girl", the new CD of the reunion of the Tears for Fears Everybody Loves a Happy Ending and the return of former Spice Girl Melanie C with the album Beautiful Intention. In 2005 Planet Records had artists present at the Festivalbar. In 2006 it released the first Italian product from Piper whose single CD was Ciao Ciao.

Planet Records released and promoted the new solo album This Time by the former Spice Girl Melanie C and promoted the Aventura's new album KOB and in April 2008 a new album by Hanson.

Planet Records opened an office at Miami, Florida and became Planet Records US LLC.

Omega, El Cata, Gente De Zona, Alex Matos, Prince Royce, Luis Enrique, Fito Blanko were promoted by Planet Records.

Artists 

Prince Royce
Toby Love
Divan
Gente de Zona
Omega
Jacob Forever 
Nicky Jam
Osmani Garcia
Don Omar
Baby Lores
Los 4
Los Van Van
Charanga Habanera
Issac Delgado
Maykel Blanco 
Manolito Simonet y su Trabuco
Laritza Bacallao
Fito Blanko
Fuego
Huey Dunbar
Andy Andy
Tito Nieves
Tito Swing
Ilegales
Papi Sánchez
Luis Enrique
Raulin Rodriguez
Chiquito Team Band
El Cata
Leslie Grace
Alex Matos
Solo 2
Marvin Freddy
Tapo & Raya
Amara la Negra
Yiyo Sarante
DJ Mams
Carolina Marconi
Los Principales
Rumai
Paolo Belli
Loretta Grace
Vena
Honorebel
Moya
Nicola Di Bardi
Tears for Fears
Agnes
Melane C
Hound Dogs
The Ark
Sr Oliver Skardy

International artists 
Tears For Fears
Melanie C
Agnes
The Ark
Hanson

References 

Italian companies established in 1998
Companies based in Naples
Italian record labels